S14 may refer to:

Aircraft 
 Fokker S.14 Machtrainer, a Dutch jet trainer
 Letov Š-14, a Czechoslovakian fighter
 Rans S-14 Airaile, an American civil utility aircraft
 Short S.14 Sarafrand, a British biplane flying boat
 Sikorsky S-14, a Russian aircraft design proposal

Automobiles 
 BMW S14, an automobile engine
 Nissan Silvia (S14), a Japanese sports car
 Nissan 240SX (S14), a sports car sold in North America

Rail and transit

Lines 
 S14 (St. Gallen S-Bahn), in Thurgau, Switzerland
 S14 (ZVV), in Zürich and Zug, Switzerland
 Line S14 (Milan suburban railway service)

Locomotives 
 LSWR S14 class, a steam locomotive

Stations 
 Aratama-bashi Station, in Mizuho-ku, Nagoya, Aichi Prefecture, Japan
 Gakuen-Toshi Station, in Kobe, Hyōgo Prefecture, Japan
 Iyo-Shirataki Station, in Ōzu, Ehime Prefecture, Japan
 Minami-Otaru Station, in Otaru, Hokkaido, Japan
 Nishi-Nagahori Station, in Nishi-ku, Osaka, Japan
 Nishi-ojima Station, in Kōtō, Tokyo, Japan

Roads 
 Expressway S14 (Poland)
 County Route S14 (California), United States

Science 
 40S ribosomal protein S14
 British NVC community S14, a swamps and tall-herb fens community in the British National Vegetation Classification system
 S14: Keep away from ... (incompatible materials to be indicated by the manufacturer), a safety phrase
 S14, a star orbiting Sagittarius A*

Vessels 
 
 , an armed yacht of the Royal Canadian Navy
 , a submarine of the Royal Navy
 , a torpedo boat of the Imperial German Navy
 , a submarine of the United States Navy

Other uses 
 S14 (classification), a Paralympic swimming disability classification for intellectually disabled athletes
 S14 (Ukrainian group), a radical nationalist group in Ukraine
 S14, a postcode district in Sheffield, England